Pittsford may refer to:

Places in the United States
Pittsford Township, Michigan
Pittsford, Michigan
Pittsford, New York, a town
Pittsford (village), New York 
Pittsford, Vermont, a New England town
Pittsford (CDP), Vermont, the main village in the town
Pittsford Township, Butler County, Iowa